Vojtech Zamarovský (October 5, 1919 in Zamarovce – July 26, 2006 in Prague) was a popular Slovak writer of historical non-fiction literature. He also translated from English, German, French and Latin.

After studying law and economics in Bratislava and Prague, Zamarovský moved to Prague and worked in several state offices. From 1956 on he worked only as a writer. His books concentrated on the life of ancient Mediterranean nations. He wrote both in the Slovak and Czech languages. Zamarovský became immensely popular in Czechoslovakia, and his works were also translated abroad.

Zamarovský was a collaborator with the communist secret police StB for more than 20 years. Since 1962 he had worked under the code name of Belo, in 1977 he became an intelligence agent, and his code name was changed to Veil.

During his final years he suffered from Parkinson's disease, and spent the last two months of his life in a coma.

Major works
Books (with literal English translations):
Bohovia a hrdinovia antických bájí (1969) [Gods and heroes of ancient myths] - a dictionary of ancient Greek and Roman mythology
Bohovia a králi starého Egypta (1986) [Gods and kings of ancient Egypt] - history of ancient Egypt
Dejiny písané Rímom (1971) [History written by Rome] - history of the Roman Empire
Grécky zázrak (1974) [The Greek wonder] - history of ancient Greece
Ich veličenstvá pyramídy (1977) [Their Majesties, the pyramids] - on Egyptian pyramids
Na počiatku bol Sumer (1966) [At the beginning, there was Sumer] - history of the Sumerians
Objavenie Tróje (1962) [The discovery of Troy] - history of archaeological excavations in Troy and an explanation of old Greek epics and mythology
Vzkriesenie Olympie (1978) [Resurrection of Olympia] - history of the Olympic Games
Za siedmimi divmi sveta (1960) [Quest of the Seven Wonders of the World] - description of ancient monuments and of the corresponding cultures 
Za tajemstvím říše Chetitů (1961) [Quest of the Mystery of the Empire of the Hittites] - a homage to Bedřich Hrozný, who was the first to decipher Hittite language (therefore the book was written in Czech first)

TV series (13 episodes):
Veľké civilizácie staroveku [Great Civilizations of Ancient Times]

References

External links
 Short biography (in Slovak)
 More detailed biography (in Czech)
 Interview from 2001, self-biography (in Czech)

1919 births
2006 deaths
Deaths from Parkinson's disease
Neurological disease deaths in the Czech Republic
Slovak writers
Czechoslovak writers
People from Trenčín District
StB